Damir Matulović (born 16 January 1976) is a retired Croatian football midfielder.

References

1976 births
Living people
Footballers from Split, Croatia
Association football midfielders
Croatian footballers
HNK Hajduk Split players
HNK Rijeka players
NK Istra 1961 players
NK Žepče players
NK Čelik Zenica players
HNK Šibenik players
NK Hrvatski Dragovoljac players
Croatian Football League players
Premier League of Bosnia and Herzegovina players
First Football League (Croatia) players
Croatian expatriate footballers
Expatriate footballers in Bosnia and Herzegovina
Croatian expatriate sportspeople in Bosnia and Herzegovina